The Women's points race was held on 19 October 2012. 12 riders participated over a distance of  – or 100 laps – with a sprint every 10 laps for extra points. A lap gained 20 points.

Medalists

Results
The race was held at 20:38.

References

Women's points race
European Track Championships – Women's points race